"Only a Dream" is a song released and performed by the British rock band The Kinks, written by the main songwriter of the band, Ray Davies. The song appeared on their 1993 album Phobia, the band's final LP.

Background
Ray Davies said of the song in a 1993 interview, "I think I kind of found my voice again on 'Only a Dream,' which I wrote on a plane to England after I decided that the album needed to have a little more humanity. It's odd that an artist who's supposed to have been around still gets intimidated by certain things, but I do, and I had to really get myself prepared to do that vocal. The night before I did, I went out and got rat-arsed drunk on wine. I was still shaking when I got to the studio the next morning, and I did the vocal in one take. It's only a pop song, but there's a lot of emotion in it and there's a lot of me in it."

Lyrics
In the lyrics of "Only a Dream", the singer falls in love with whom he describes as "a young executive." He doesn't expect her to "even look at [him] or bother to glance [his] way, but she actually smiled at [him] and said 'Hi-ya handsome, have a good day.'" He starts to wonder if the event was real or "only a dream." On another day, the singer awaits his love to return, only to see her talking to another man, ignoring him entirely. He is crushed, but still wondering if the whole event was "only a dream."

Release and reception
"Only a Dream" was first released as the sixth song on The Kinks' first Columbia album, Phobia. The album was not met with much success, not charting in Britain, and only hitting #166 in America. Despite the failure of the album, the track was released separately as a standalone single, backed with "Somebody Stole My Car" (another song from the Phobia album.) The single had minimal success, hitting #79 in Britain. A second single from Phobia, "Scattered", was advertised to follow up "Only a Dream", but was cancelled and eventually released in small quantities to collectors. One year later, Columbia Records dropped The Kinks.

The song also appeared on the compilation album, Picture Book.

Music video
Like many other Kinks tracks of the era, a music video was shot for "Only a Dream." Featuring both Ray Davies and Dave Davies, Ray Davies lip-synced the song.

References

The Kinks songs
1993 singles
Songs written by Ray Davies
Song recordings produced by Ray Davies
1993 songs
MCA Records singles